Paul Greenberg may refer to:

 Paul Greenberg (journalist) (1937–2021), winner of Pulitzer Prize for Editorial Writing
 Paul Greenberg (voice actor) (born 1965)
 Paul Greenberg (essayist) (born 1967), author of "Four Fish"
 Paul Greenberg (executive), Digital Media CEO
 Paul Greenberg (producer), film and commercial producer